Code R is an American action-adventure television series that aired on CBS from January 21 to June 10, 1977. Code R focuses on the emergency services (police, fire, and ocean rescue) of the California Channel Islands. The series starred James Houghton, Martin Kove and Tom Simcox and ran for a single season of thirteen episodes.

Synopsis
Simcox was cast as Walt Robinson, the island police chief. Joan Freeman played his wife, Barbara, and Robbie Rundle appeared as their young son, Bobby. Former professional footballer Ben Davidson played Walt's police deputy, Ted Milbank. Houghton was cast as Rick Wilson, chief of the island's fire services, and Kove was George Baker, the chief of beaches and ocean rescue. As all of the Island's Emergency Services were based in the same building, Susanne Reed played Suzy, their dispatch operator. WT Zacha played Harry, the owner and bartender of the Lighthouse Bar where the rescue teams often went while off-duty.

Episodes

Production notes
The program was produced by Edwin Self for Warner Brothers. Despite being short-lived, Code R was screened in various countries around the world and was shown by ITV in the United Kingdom in the late 1970s in a late afternoon slot.

Code R was a midseason replacement for another, equally short-lived action-adventure series, Spencer's Pilots. In his book Total Television, television  historian Alex McNeil wrote that Code R was "an unimaginative imitation of NBC's Emergency!", another midseason offering that began in January 1972. McNeil also noted that the "8 p.m. Eastern Time slot" was the weakest on the entire schedule in the 1976-1977 season for CBS.

Reception
Code R'''s competition was The Donny and Marie Show on ABC and two situation comedies on NBC, Sanford and Son and Chico and the Man''. Due to low ratings, the show was cancelled after only thirteen episodes.

References

External links
 

1977 American television series debuts
1977 American television series endings
American action television series
CBS original programming
English-language television shows
Television series by Warner Bros. Television Studios
Television shows set in California
Television series about firefighting
American action adventure television series